Djené Dakonam Ortega (born 31 December 1991), known as Djené, is a Togolese professional footballer who plays for and captains La Liga club Getafe and the Togo national team. Mainly a centre-back, he can also play as a right-back.

Club career
Born in Dapaong, Djené moved to Benin in 2009, after graduating from Étoile Filante du Togo's youth setup, joining Tonnerre d'Abomey. In 2011, he moved to Coton Sport in Cameroonian Elite One, appearing regularly afterwards.

Djené was named in the Coton Sport's squad for the 2012 CAF Champions League campaign. In November 2013, he went on a trial at Ligue 2 side RC Lens, only returning to his parent club six months later.

In August 2014, Djené went on a trial at Spanish Segunda División side AD Alcorcón, joining the club permanently on 25 October. He made his debut on the following day, starting in a 1–3 home loss against Real Zaragoza.

On 23 March 2015, after already being a regular starter for the Madrid side, Djené renewed his contract until 2018. On 9 May, he scored his first professional goal, netting the game's only in an away success at CE Sabadell FC.

On 1 July 2016, Djené was transferred to Belgian First Division A club Sint-Truidense. On 24 July of the following year, he returned to Spain, after agreeing to a four-year deal with La Liga side Getafe CF.

Djené's debut in the top division of Spanish football came on 20 August 2017, starting in a 0–0 away draw against Athletic Bilbao. He scored his first goal in the category on 17 March, netting the equalizer in a 2–1 away defeat of Real Sociedad.

International career
Djené was named in Togo's main squad for the 2011 WAFU Nations Cup, shortly after being called up by Benin. He made his international debut on 8 September 2012, starting in a 1–1 draw against Gabon.

Djené was included in Didier Six's 23-man squad for the 2013 Africa Cup of Nations, and appeared in all of Togo's matches during the tournament, being eventually knocked out in the quarter-finals.

Career statistics

Club

International

Honours
Coton Sport
Elite One: 2013, 2014
Cameroonian Cup: 2014

Individual
UEFA La Liga Team of The Season: 2018–19

References

External links
 Profile at the Getafe CF website
 
 
 

1991 births
Living people
People from Savanes Region, Togo
Togolese footballers
Association football defenders
Étoile Filante du Togo players
Benin Premier League players
Tonnerre d'Abomey FC players
Elite One players
Coton Sport FC de Garoua players
La Liga players
Segunda División players
AD Alcorcón footballers
Getafe CF footballers
Belgian Pro League players
Sint-Truidense V.V. players
Togolese expatriate footballers
Expatriate footballers in Benin
Togolese expatriate sportspeople in Benin
Expatriate footballers in Cameroon
Togolese expatriate sportspeople in Cameroon
Expatriate footballers in Spain
Togolese expatriate sportspeople in Spain
Expatriate footballers in Belgium
Togolese expatriate sportspeople in Belgium
Togo youth international footballers
Togo international footballers
2013 Africa Cup of Nations players
2017 Africa Cup of Nations players
21st-century Togolese people